Kramim (lit. Vineyards) is a kibbutz in southern Israel. Located around a kilometer west of Meitar, it falls under the jurisdiction of Bnei Shimon Regional Council.

History
The kibbutz was founded in 1980 by an urban society group organized by the Kibbutz Movement.

Economy
The kibbutz grows peaches, potatoes, carrots, garlic, peppers and wheat in collaboration with Kibbutz Lahav and Kibbutz  Shomria, and has recently planted olive orchards alongside its wine-grape vineyards. The Kibbutz industries also operates Gan Hakramim Country Lodging and a chicken coop. Enlight Renewable Energy entered a leasing agreement with Kibbutz Kramim to build a 5 megawatt photo-voltaic solar field on the kibbutz's land.

References

External links
Official website

Kibbutzim
Kibbutz Movement
Populated places established in 1980
Populated places in Southern District (Israel)
1980 establishments in Israel